Lamine Fofana (born 10 November 1998) is an Ivorian football player who plays as a midfielder for Italian  club Messina.

Career
He made his Serie C debut for Fermana on 16 September 2018 in a game against Virtus Verona.

Fofana left Carpi at the end of 2020–21 season.

On 7 August 2021, he joined Messina on a two-year deal.

References

External links
 

1998 births
Living people
People from Bingerville
Ivorian footballers
Association football midfielders
Serie C players
Serie D players
A.C. Tuttocuoio 1957 San_Miniato players
A.C. Carpi players
A.S.D. Sangiovannese 1927 players
Savona F.B.C. players
Fermana F.C. players
A.C.R. Messina players
Ivorian expatriate footballers
Ivorian expatriate sportspeople in Italy
Expatriate footballers in Italy